Miguel Juan Llambrich (born 18 January 1996), commonly known as Miguelón, is a Spanish professional footballer who plays as a right back for FC Cartagena, on loan from RCD Espanyol.

Club career
Born in Benidorm, Alicante, Valencian Community, Miguelón joined Villarreal CF's youth setup in 2006, after stints at Benidorm CF and Alicante CF. He made his senior debut with the C-team on 22 August 2015, starting in a 1–1 away draw against UD Alzira.

On 28 November 2015, Miguelón played the full 90 minutes with the reserves in a 3–2 home win against CD Eldense, after both Felipe Alfonso and Edgar Ié were unavailable due to injury. On 3 December he made his first team debut, starting in a 2–3 Copa del Rey away loss against SD Huesca.

Miguelón was definitely promoted to the main squad on 2 August 2018. On 11 July 2019, after being rarely used, he was loaned to Huesca for one year.

On 25 August 2020, after achieving promotion with Huesca, Miguelón was loaned to fellow second division side RCD Espanyol for one year. He also promoted to the top tier with the latter side, signing a permanent deal with them on 2 June 2021.

On 11 July 2022, Miguelón was loaned to second division side Real Oviedo for the season. The following 5 January, he moved to fellow league team FC Cartagena also in a temporary deal.

Career statistics

Club

References

External links
Villarreal official profile 

1996 births
Living people
People from Benidorm
Sportspeople from the Province of Alicante
Spanish footballers
Footballers from the Valencian Community
Association football defenders
La Liga players
Segunda División players
Segunda División B players
Tercera División players
Villarreal CF C players
Villarreal CF B players
Villarreal CF players
SD Huesca footballers
RCD Espanyol footballers
Real Oviedo players
FC Cartagena footballers